Oxcart or ox cart can mean:
Bullock cart, a cart pulled by oxen
CIA codename for the program to produce the Lockheed A-12 reconnaissance aircraft

See also:
Ox-Cart Library
Ox-Cart Man
Red River ox cart